Lycée Frédéric Bartholdi may refer to the following French schools:
 Lycée Bartholdi (Barentin), Barentin
 , Colmar
 Lycée Bartholdi (Saint-Denis, Seine-Saint-Denis), Paris area